Laurel and Michigan Avenues Row was a set of historic rowhouses located at Buffalo in Erie County, New York.  It was a set of speculative multi-unit frame residences designed to resemble rowhouses. The set of nine frame, two story rowhouses were built about 1880. They were demolished in 1997.

It was listed on the National Register of Historic Places in 1986.

References

External links
Laurel and Michigan Avenues Row - U.S. National Register of Historic Places on Waymarking.com

Residential buildings on the National Register of Historic Places in New York (state)
Italianate architecture in New York (state)
Houses completed in 1880
Houses in Buffalo, New York
National Register of Historic Places in Buffalo, New York